Herbert Brunwin (28 April 1912 — 17 January 2017) was an English cricketer. He was a right-handed batsman and a right-arm medium-fast bowler who played for Essex during the 1937 season. Brunwin was born in Layer-de-la-Haye and died in Colchester.

In the single first-class match in which he played, Brunwin, a tailender, made two runs before a first-innings declaration in an innings in which team-mates Reginald Taylor, Jack O'Connor and Stan Nichols each scored centuries. The game finished in an innings victory for the Essex side.

References

External links 
 Herbert Brunwin at Cricket Archive 

1912 births
1990 deaths
English cricketers
Essex cricketers